Dvorichna is an urban-type settlement in Kupiansk Raion, Kharkiv Oblast (province) of eastern Ukraine. It hosts the administration of Dvorichna settlement hromada, one of the hromadas of Ukraine. Population:

History 
It was a village in Kharkov Governorate of the Russian Empire.

A local newspaper is published here since July 1931.

Urban-type settlement since 1960.

In January 1989 the population was 4807 people. 

In January 2013 the population was 3812 people.

Until 18 July 2020, Dvorichna was the administrative center of Dvorichna Raion. The raion was abolished in July 2020 as part of the administrative reform of Ukraine, which reduced the number of raions of Kharkiv Oblast to seven. The area of Dvorichna Raion was merged into Kupiansk Raion.

During the 2022 Russian invasion of Ukraine, Dvorichna was a scene of fighting for over a month before being occupied by Russian forces on 14 April 2022. On 11 September 2022, the settlement returned to Ukrainian control during a major counteroffensive in Kharkiv Oblast.

References

External links
 Dvorichna at the Verkhovna Rada of Ukraine site

Urban-type settlements in Kupiansk Raion